The 1938 Western Reserve Red Cats football team represented Western Reserve University, now known as Case Western Reserve University, during the 1938 college football season. The team was led by fourth-year head coach Bill Edwards, assisted by Roy A. "Dugan" Miller.  Notable players included Johnny Wilson, Mike Rodak, Steve Belichick, and Dick Booth.  The team went undefeated defeating opponents by a combined 259-31.

Schedule

References

Western Reserve
Case Western Reserve Spartans football seasons
College football undefeated seasons
Western Reserve Red Cats football